Landerd is a former municipality within the province of North Brabant in the southern Netherlands. Since 2022 it has been part of the new municipality of Maashorst.

History
Landerd is the result of a merger between the formerly independent municipalities of Schaijk and Zeeland on 1 January 1994. Schaijk and Reek had merged earlier on 1 July 1942.

Population centres 
Reek
Schaijk
Zeeland

Topography

Map of the former municipality of Landerd, 2015

Notable people 

 Monique van de Ven (born 1952 in Zeeland) a Dutch actress and director
 Tonnie Dirks (born 1961 in Zeeland) a Dutch former long distance runner, competed in the 1992 Summer Olympics
 Daphny van den Brand (born 1978 in Zeeland) a Dutch cyclo-cross, road bicycle and mountain bike racer.
 Thijs Ploegmakers (born 1980 in Schaijk) performs as Adaro, is a Dutch DJ.

Gallery

References

External links 

Official website

Former municipalities of North Brabant
Municipalities of the Netherlands established in 1994
Municipalities of the Netherlands disestablished in 2022
Geography of Maashorst